Tissier is a surname of French origin.  It can refer to the following people:

Amandine Tissier, a handball player
Bernard Tissier de Mallerais, a French Traditionalist Roman Catholic bishop
Christian Tissier, an aikido teacher
Georgette Tissier, an actor and spouse of Jean Tissier
Jean Tissier, an actor and spouse of Georgette Tissier
Luke Le Tissier, a cricketer
Matt Le Tissier, a former football player and television presenter